Kings of the High Frontier is a hard science fiction novel by Victor Koman, first published (electronically) in 1996.

Summary
The story is a polemic about NASA. The thesis is that NASA, far from helping space exploration, actually prevents it from going forth. The narrative follows disparate engineering efforts, ranging from New York University engineering students working out of a warehouse in the Bronx to full-fledged commercial rocket operations, to create a single-stage to orbit reusable launch vehicle.

All of the science and equipment used in the story was based on technology that existed at the time of writing, like the space activity suit.

Editions
The novel was first published electronically by J. Neil Schulman's pulpless.com in 1996. It has since been published in hardcover by Bereshith Publishing in 1998, first in a "deluxe edition" of 250, then as a regular hardcover in a small print-run of 1250 copies. , there is no paperback edition. KoPubCo released an ebook edition in 2017, with significant changes by the author.

External links

 Review at SFSite.com
 Review by Claire Wolfe for The Libertarian Enterprise

1996 science fiction novels
1996 novels
Hard science fiction